Jitka Hlaváčková, married Jitka Šimonová is a former competitive figure skater who represented Czechoslovakia. She is the 1960 Winter Universiade champion and 1962 silver medalist. She represented her country at five European Championships, placing as high as tenth (1961).

After ending her competitive career she became medical doctor.

Competitive highlights

References 

Czechoslovak female single skaters
Universiade medalists in figure skating
Living people
Year of birth missing (living people)
Universiade gold medalists for Czechoslovakia
Universiade silver medalists for Czechoslovakia
Competitors at the 1960 Winter Universiade
Competitors at the 1962 Winter Universiade